Rudeš is a neighbourhood of the city of Zagreb, Croatia, within the Trešnjevka – sjever district. The area covered by the local city council Rudeš has a population of 9,725 (2011).

There is a small Salesian church in the neighbourhood, called "The Church of St.Anne".

In Rudeš, there is also an elementary school called "Elementary school Rudeš".

A soccer team that is currently in the first Croatian soccer league and is from Rudeš is called NK Rudeš.

References

Neighbourhoods of Zagreb
Trešnjevka